Richard (Rick) Alan Jelliffe (born 1960) is an Australian programmer and standards activist (ISO, W3C, IETF), particularly associated with web standards, markup languages, internationalization and schema languages. He is the founder and Chief Technical Officer of Topologi Pty. Ltd, an XML tools vendor in Sydney. He has a degree in economics from the University of Sydney.

Career
Jelliffe is the inventor of the Schematron schema language; its core idea of using XPath to state constraints has been widely adopted and adapted. He is the editor of the ISO International Standard 19757-3 Document Schema Definition Languages - Part 3: Path Based Rule Languages (Schematron).

In 1999-2001 Jelliffe worked at Academia Sinica, Taipei, Taiwan. The Chinese XML Now! website provides Chinese and English information and test files on XML. Jelliffe has also made an English/Chinese multilingual typesetting system used to publish PRC trade laws. He has been an invited expert on Internationalization to the W3C.

Jelliffe has made many contributions to web and markup-related technologies, with a broad range of concerns:

 native language markup: the need for markup languages to allow tag names in the native language of the users—adopted into SGML (Annex J) and XML, based on Jelliffe's ERCS (Extended Reference Concrete Syntax);
 the availability of Unicode character references regardless of character encoding—adopted by XML and the SPREAD (Standardization Project Regarding East Asian Documents) entity set;
 the inadequacy of text formats without a reliable indication of encoding—adopted into XML (Appendix F);
 the inadequacy of string formats for WWW use without an indication of natural language—adopted into XML with xml:lang attribute;
 the need to make decisions about XML and other WWW textual notations based on engineering considerations—adopted into XML 1.1 where critical code points are unavailable in direct form, a redundancy which allows encoding error detection;
 the use of XPath for validation—adopted into Schematron, XForms, etc.;
 the need for extended schema languages—adopted into XML Schema ANY content model;
 developing schemas from standard or typical modules—strong in the book, XML Namespaces and XML Schema;
 the result of validation is not only boolean—adopted into Schematron and XML Schema's outcomes (e.g. PSVI).

Dealings with Microsoft
In January 2007, Microsoft "technical evangelist" Doug Mahugh asked Jelliffe to correct English Wikipedia articles about some of the standardization efforts in which he was involved, including Ecma Office Open XML and OpenDocument, suggesting that Microsoft could pay him for the time he spent editing English Wikipedia. Jelliffe commented on the offer in his blog and this led to international press coverage.

The controversial decision by Standards Australia to include Jelliffe on its delegation to the vote at the ISO on standardisation of Ecma International's Office Open XML document format was widely criticised. Some considered Jelliffe too close to Microsoft to be impartial.

Works

 The XML & SGML Cookbook: Recipes for Structured Information, Charles Goldfarb Series on Structured Information Management, 1998, Prentice Hal, .
 Editor, ISO/IEC International Standard 19757-3 Document Schema Definition Languages - Part 3: Path Based Rule Languages (Schematron).
 Numerous articles on the WWW, in print, and by  blog.

References

External links

 schematron.com
 Chinese XML Now!
 Topologi

Place of birth missing (living people)
Australian computer programmers
1960 births
Living people
University of Sydney alumni